is a Japanese footballer currently playing as a midfielder for Júbilo Iwata.

Career statistics

Club
.

Notes

References

External links

2001 births
Living people
Japanese footballers
Association football midfielders
J2 League players
J3 League players
Júbilo Iwata players
Fukushima United FC players
Sportspeople from Kanagawa Prefecture